Adventures of Gallant Bess is a 1948 American contemporary Western film directed by Lew Landers and starring Cameron Mitchell, Audrey Long, Fuzzy Knight, James Millican, and John Harmon. It was filmed in Cinecolor. It has no connection to the 1947 Metro-Goldwyn-Mayer film Gallant Bess, though publicity stated that "Bess the Wonder Horse" from the earlier film was also in this film.

Plot summary 
Drifting and down on his luck cowboy Ted Daniels captures a beautiful wild horse, names her Bess and teaches her a variety of tricks. Ted loses his ranch hand job from spending so much time with Bess. Ted thinks his luck will change by winning a large prize in a local rodeo, but the unscrupulous carnival owner, who wants Bess to appear in his show, has one of his stooges cover the horns of the steer Ted is to bulldog{wrestle] with slippery oil breaking Ted's leg in the process. Ted is laid up, and Bess comes to look for Ted. She causes damage, to a man's car when someone tries to catch her.

Having no money, Ted is forced to let Bess get sold at auction to pay for the damages. The traveling carnival owner has bought her and she is mistreated and forced into performing in the show. As Ted recovers he must decide whether to find a way to get his horse back or settle down with the doctor's daughter, who is nursing him back to health. He chooses to reunite with Bess.

Cast 
The cast is as follows:
 Cameron Mitchell as Ted Daniels
 Audrey Long as Penny Gray
 Fuzzy Knight as Woody
 James Millican as Bud Millerick
 John Harmon as Blake
 Edward Gargan as Deputy
 Harry Cheshire as Doctor Gray
 Cliff Clark as Sheriff

References

External links 

 
 

1948 films
1948 Western (genre) films
American Western (genre) films
Cinecolor films
Eagle-Lion Films films
1940s English-language films
Films about horses
Films directed by Lew Landers
Neo-Western films
Rodeo in film
1940s American films